Qubo (stylized as qubo) was an American television network for children between the ages of 5 and 14. Owned by Ion Media, it consisted of a 24-hour free-to-air television network often mentioned as the "Qubo channel" (available as a digital terrestrial television service on owned-and-operated stations and some affiliates of corporate sister Ion Television, as well as on some pay-TV providers), associated website with games and programs available through video on demand, and a weekly programming block on Ion Television, along with Ion Life, later known as Ion Plus.

Following Ion Media's acquisition by the E. W. Scripps Company, it ceased operations on February 28, 2021.

History

Formation
In May 2006, Ion Media Networks, NBCUniversal (which owned a 32% interest in Ion Media at the time), Corus Entertainment, Scholastic Corporation and Classic Media (now part of NBCUniversal's DreamWorks Animation) announced plans to launch a new, multi-platform children's entertainment brand known as Qubo, oriented towards providing "educational, values-oriented programming" targeted towards children between 5 and 14 years of age. The brand would encompass programming blocks on NBCUniversal and Ion's respective flagship broadcast television networks (NBC, Telemundo and Ion Television), a video on demand service, a website, and a standalone 24-hour network to be carried as a digital subchannel on terrestrial television stations owned by Ion Media Networks and by pay-TV providers.

Qubo president Rick Rodríguez (who formerly served as a programming executive at Discovery Communications) stated in a 2008 interview with Multichannel News that Qubo was designed as a bilingual brand, offering programming in both English and Spanish (with the latter's audio available through the SAP audio feed on most programming, along with the "CC3" closed captioning channel for Spanish text). While Qubo would initially carry Spanish-language dubs of its programming for both its Telemundo block and (through the SAP audio feed) the standalone 24-hour network, Rodríguez did not rule out the possibility of developing original children's programming geared to Hispanic and Latino audiences through Qubo in the future. He felt that the market for Spanish-language children's programming had been underserved by existing outlets (such as Telemundo and Univision), and envisioned the possibility of programming which could "bridge the gap" and educate Spanish-speaking children on the English language, and vice versa.

The Qubo brand was intended to represent a "building block for kids," as reflected by its logo. The name "Qubo" was chosen because it had a "fun" sound, and the root word, "cube", was nearly crosslingual in both English and Spanish (cubo).

Launch
Qubo launched on September 9, 2006, with the premiere of weekend morning blocks on NBC (which aired exclusively on Saturday mornings, replacing Discovery Kids on NBC, a weekly block programmed by the Discovery Kids cable network) and Telemundo (which aired on both Saturday and Sunday mornings, replacing Telemundo Kids). This was followed by the September 15 introduction of a daytime block on Ion Television (then known as i: Independent Television), which initially aired on Friday afternoons. At launch, its programming included the first-run animated series Dragon (produced by Scholastic), Jacob Two-Two,  Babar, and Jane and the Dragon (produced by Canada-based animation studio Nelvana), alongside VeggieTales and its spin-offs 3-2-1 Penguins! and Larryboy: The Cartoon Adventures (produced by Classic Media subsidiary Big Idea) – marking the first time that VeggieTales had ever been broadcast as a television program. 

All shows listed on the initial schedule made their official debuts on US television. Jacob Two-Two, however, was the only exception as that show previously aired with its Spanish dub on the predecessor of Telemundo's Qubo block, Telemundo Kids. The show premiered there on January 9, 2005, and was the only show from that block to transition to Qubo en Telemundo.

VeggieTales and its spin-offs incorporated lessons related to Christian teachings; initially, this religious content was edited out of the original VeggieTales broadcasts on Qubo at the request of NBC's standards and practices department. The move, however, drew criticism from the conservative watchdog group Parents Television Council, which filed a complaint against NBC. A representative for NBC replied in a statement that the editing conformed to guidelines within the network's broadcast standards "not to advocate any one religious point of view". VeggieTales creator Phil Vischer also expressed discontent with the edits, stating that he was not informed that religious content would be removed from the series, and that he would have refused to sign a contract with Qubo if he had known of the decision beforehand. Vischer said, "I would have declined partly because I knew a lot of fans would feel like it was a sellout or it was done for money." Still, Vischer added that he understood NBC's wish to remain religiously neutral, and said, "VeggieTales is religious, NBC is not. I want to focus people more on 'Isn't it cool that Bob and Larry are on television?'"

In December 2006, a Spanish-language version of the Qubo website was launched. The 24-hour Qubo network launched on Ion Media Networks' terrestrial stations on January 8, 2007 at 6:00 a.m., with Theodore Tugboat being the first program to air on the network at launch. The feed replaced a 3 hour timeshift of the main Ion network for the West Coast of the United States. The network initially included a schedule of children's programming in rolling four-hour blocks; Ion intended to attempt carriage of the channel on pay-TV providers. In May of that year, NBCUniversal sold its minority stake in Ion Media Networks to Citadel LLC. On December 3, 2007, Qubo expanded its programming offerings to include shows from other producers, as well as some programs that were already airing on Ion Television's Qubo block. In addition, the rolling schedule was expanded to a six-hour block, which repeated four times per day.

In January 2008, Ion Media Networks and Comcast reached an agreement to continue carrying Ion's digital terrestrial channels, including Qubo and Ion Life. In August 2008, Qubo introduced guidelines for advertisers in an effort to help fight childhood obesity, committing to only accept advertisements for products which meet nutritional guidelines determined by the network in partnership with childhood obesity expert Goutham Rao. Qubo also began to air a series of public service announcements featuring characters from its programs in association with the Ad Council, the United States Olympic Committee and the Department of Health and Human Services, advocating exercise and healthy living.

In May 2009, Ion Media Networks filed an inquiry with the Federal Communications Commission to attempt must-carry subscription television carriage to expand Qubo's distribution to other providers. Later in May 2010, Ion signed carriage agreements with Advanced Cable Communications and Blue Ridge Communications, as well as deal with Comcast's Colorado Springs system to add Qubo on the providers' digital tiers.

Ion acquisition of partner stakes
With NBCUniversal dropping out of the joint venture following its acquisition by Comcast, it was announced on March 28, 2012, that NBC and Telemundo would discontinue their Qubo blocks and replace them with NBC Kids and MiTelemundo on July 7. Both blocks would be programmed by PBS Kids Sprout, a preschool-oriented television network that came under NBCUniversal ownership as part of the merger. This left Ion Television as the only remaining network with a Qubo-branded programming block (with Ion Media acquiring NBCUniversal's interest in the venture).

Ion Media Networks acquired the stakes in Qubo held by Classic Media (which became DreamWorks Classics in 2012 after its acquisition by DreamWorks Animation), Scholastic Corporation and Corus Entertainment in 2013, with all three companies retaining program distribution partnerships with the network. The Qubo block on Ion Television was rebranded as the "Qubo Kids Corner" on January 4, 2015, concurrent with the block's move from Friday to Sunday mornings. On September 8, 2020, the block also began airing on Ion Plus during Monday mornings due to E/I commitments, since they had eight stations in the network that had DT1 main-channel carriage rather than subchannel carriage.

Scripps purchase, network closure
On September 24, 2020, the E. W. Scripps Company announced an agreement to buy Ion Media for $2.65 billion. The transaction, which closed on January 7, 2021, saw Ion Television, Ion Plus, Qubo and infomercial service Shop Ion integrated into Scripps' Katz Broadcasting subsidiary (operator of fellow multicast networks Court TV, Court TV Mystery, Bounce TV, Laff and Grit).

On January 14, 2021, Scripps announced that it would discontinue Ion Plus, Qubo, and Shop Ion effective February 28. The spectrum allocated to the networks on the former Ion Media stations was repurposed to carry the Katz-owned networks starting March 1, with the initial slate of Ion Television O&Os adding those networks following the expiration of Scripps/Katz's existing contracts with other broadcasting companies the day prior, and other stations following suit as contracts with existing affiliates expire throughout 2021 and 2022; in markets where major network affiliates operated by Scripps already carry a Katz-owned network, some will be offloaded to the Ion stations to free up limited spectrum capacity during the ATSC 3.0 transition.

After March 1, Scripps began to utilize an outside-sourced three-hour block of programming on Ion Television Friday mornings in order to meet their E/I burden without any Qubo branding, including Finding Stuff Out and Science Max (both were past Qubo series), as well as Xploration Station programs from Steve Rotfeld Productions. The Qubo website redirected to the main Ion website shortly thereafter, then completely shut down. Ion Plus, which converted to an advertiser-supported network on the Samsung and Vizio smart TV platforms, also dropped Qubo programming from its schedule, as it is now outside of FCC purview and requirements.

The network's oncoming sign-off went unacknowledged on-air outside occasional ticker announcements. Some affiliates abruptly switched the night of February 26 to other Katz networks, while others were switched automatically at the end of the 28th at the master control level, at which point the network ceased operations during an episode of Inspector Gadget. Qubo's Twitter account also acknowledged the shutdown.

Programming

Qubo featured archived content from the programming libraries of NBCUniversal, Corus Entertainment, Scholastic Corporation, DreamWorks Animation, DreamWorks Classics, Trilogy Animation Group, WildBrain, Nelvana, 9 Story Media Group and Splash Entertainment, with its programs targeted all ages 5 to 14. Though there was a first agreement of the two companies - NBCUniversal, and Ion Media - to produce a new series for the network and program block each year, Qubo only produced three original series: My Friend Rabbit (2007–08), Turbo Dogs (2008-11), and season 1 of Shelldon (2009–12). Qubo regularly broadcast series aimed at preschoolers during the morning and afternoon hours, while series aimed at older children were featured as part of the network's evening schedule.

Programming on Qubo and its companion blocks on Ion Television and Ion Plus accounted for all educational programming content on Ion Television's owned-and-operated stations and certain Ion affiliates that carry the 24-hour channel, relieving the network from the responsibility of carrying programs compliant with guidelines dictated by the Children's Television Act on its other subchannel services. This allowed Ion to carry Ion Shop, HSN and QVC without overlaying any E/I programming on those subchannels.

On September 27, 2010, Qubo launched "Qubo Night Owl", (running from 12:00 to 6:00 a.m. ET) featuring classic animated series, many of which came from the Filmation library owned by DreamWorks Animation (currently owned by NBCUniversal). The block was restructured in August 2013 to feature a mixture of animated and live-action series sourced only from Qubo's distribution partners. It was discontinued as Ion Media decided to reduce the amount of religious and paid programming on Ion Television and Ion Plus by shifting those hours to Qubo's overnight schedule between 1:00 to 6:00 a.m. Eastern.

Affiliates

, Qubo had current and pending affiliation agreements with 67 television stations encompassing 34 states and the District of Columbia. The network has an estimated national reach of 58.83% of all households in the United States (or 183,832,858 American families with at least one television set). Like parent network Ion Television, the network's stations almost exclusively consisted of network-owned stations (with the exception of Louisville, Kentucky affiliate WBNA). Qubo's programming was available by default via a national feed that was delivered directly to cable and satellite providers in markets without a local Ion Television station that carries the network.

Qubo did not have any over-the-air stations in several major markets, most notably Toledo, Ohio; San Diego, California; Charlotte, North Carolina; Richmond, Virginia; Green Bay, Wisconsin; and Cincinnati, Ohio. A key factor in the network's limited national broadcast coverage is the fact that Ion Media Networks did not actively attempt over-the-air distribution for the network on the digital subchannels of other network-affiliated stations (in contrast, its parent network Ion Television – which had similarly limited national coverage following the digital television transition – had begun subchannel-only affiliation arrangements through agreements with NBC Owned Television Stations' Telemundo Station Group subsidiary and Nexstar Media Group during 2014 and 2015), with very few stations that contractually carry the network's programming (with limited exceptions in markets such as Louisville, Kentucky and Anchorage, Alaska). As a result, Ion Media Networks owned most of Qubo's station base.

References

Qubo
Ion Television
DreamWorks Classics
National Broadcasting Company
Telemundo
Former Comcast subsidiaries
Former General Electric subsidiaries
Former Vivendi subsidiaries
Former Corus Entertainment subsidiaries
Joint ventures
Scholastic Corporation
Defunct television networks in the United States
Television channels and stations established in 2006
Television channels and stations disestablished in 2021
Children's television networks
Children's television networks in the United States